The 2015–16 Tulane Green Wave men's basketball team represented Tulane University during the 2015–16 NCAA Division I men's basketball season. The Green Wave, led by sixth-year head coach Ed Conroy, played their home games at Devlin Fieldhouse and were second year members of the American Athletic Conference. They finished the season 12–22, 3–15 in AAC play to finish in last place. They defeated UCF and Houston in the AAC tournament to advance to the semifinals before losing to Memphis.

Following the season, Tulane fired head coach Ed Conroy. On March 25, 2016, the school hired Mike Dunleavy Sr. as head coach.

Previous season 
The Green Wave finished the 2014–15 season 15–16, 6–12 in AAC play to finish in a tie for seventh place. They lost in the first round of the AAC tournament to Houston.

Departures

Incoming Transfers

Incoming recruits

Roster

}

Schedule

|-
!colspan=9 style="background:#00331A; color:#87CEEB;"|  Exhibition

|-
!colspan=9 style="background:#00331A; color:#87CEEB;"|  Non-conference regular season

|-
!colspan=9 style="background:#00331A; color:#87CEEB;"|  Conference regular season

|-
!colspan=9 style="background:#063003; color:#CCEEFF;"| 2016 American Athletic Conference tournament

References

Tulane Green Wave men's basketball seasons
Tulane
Tulane
Tulane